Lycée Le Corbusier may refer to the following schools in France:
 Lycée Le Corbusier - Aubervilliers
 Lycée Le Corbusier - Cormeilles-en-Parisis
 Lycée Le Corbusier - Illkirch-Graffenstaden
 Lycée Le Corbusier - Poissy
 Lycée Le Corbusier - Saint-Étienne-du-Rouvray